Explosion! The Sound of Slide Hampton is an album by American jazz trombonist, composer and arranger Slide Hampton which was released on the Atlantic label in 1962.

Reception

Allmusic gave the album 3 stars.

Track listing 
All compositions by Slide Hampton, except as indicated.
 "Revival" - 2:22
 "Maria" (Leonard Bernstein, Stephen Sondheim) - 2:22
 "Delilah" (Henry Manners, Jimmy Shirl) - 3:56
 "Begin the Beguine" (Cole Porter) - 2:30
 "Your Cheatin' Heart" (Hank Williams) - 2:58
 "Spanish Flier" - 3:22
 "Bye Bye Love" (Boudleaux Bryant, Felice Bryant) - 2:55
 "Love Letters" (Victor Young, Edward Heyman) - 3:26
 "Slide's Blues" - 5:26
Recorded in NYC on July 26, 1962 (tracks 2, 4, 6 & 9) and August 28, 1962 (tracks 1, 3, 5, 7, 8)

Personnel 
Slide Hampton - trombone, arranger
Johnny Bello, Chet Ferretti, Jerry Tyree - trumpet
Benny Jacobs-El - trombone
Joe Farrell - tenor saxophone
Jay Cameron, (1, 3, 5, 7, 8) Ronnie Cuber (2, 4, 6 & 9) - baritone saxophone
Walter Davis, Jr., (1, 3, 5, 7, 8) Horace Parlan (2, 4, 6 & 9) - piano
Bob Cranshaw - bass
Vinnie Ruggiero - drums
Willie Bobo - congas (2, 4, 6 & 9)

References 

Slide Hampton albums
1962 albums
Atlantic Records albums
Albums produced by Tom Dowd